Schwa with acute (Ә́ ә́; italics: Ә́ ә́) is a letter of the Cyrillic script.

Schwa with acute is sometimes used in the Tatar language, where it represents the near-open front unrounded vowel .

See also
Cyrillic characters in Unicode

Cyrillic letters with diacritics